The 2007–08 Mississippi State basketball team represented Mississippi State University in the 2007–08 college basketball season. Under head coach Rick Stansbury, the team played their home games at Humphrey Coliseum in Starkville, Mississippi, and was a member of the Southeastern Conference.

Previous season 
The 2006–07 Bulldogs finished the season 21–14 (8–8 in SEC play) and reached the NIT Final Four.

Before the season

Departures
In additions to losing two seniors from the 2006–07, four players (80% of the 2005 recruiting class) transferred to others schools over the offseason.

Recruits

Roster

References 

Mississippi State
Mississippi State Bulldogs men's basketball seasons
Mississippi State
Bull
Bull